Bigger Than America is the sixth studio album by the English synthpop band Heaven 17. It was originally released in September 1996, on the label Eye of the Storm, eight years after their previous album, Teddy Bear, Duke & Psycho.

The album peaked at number one on Germany Alphabeat Redaktionscharts' Rock/Pop/Alternative Charts in November 1996, but did not chart in the UK. It was listed as number 6 on the online music magazine Addicted to Noise's Writers Poll.

In an interview with The Guardian in 2010, Ware recalled: "This went under the radar to the extent that hardly anybody in this country knew about it; we did do an album in '95 called Bigger Than America, which was our attempt to re-engage early analogue synths and create an album based on that. It just got lost in the big Warner Brothers machine."

Critical reception

Upon its release, Caroline Sullivan of The Guardian commented: "Heaven 17 have hardly changed [and] things are much the same - just less melodic. Marsh and Ware still produce plinky, one-tempo backbeats, [and] Gregory's lyrics are disillusioned, even morose. "We Blame Love" has the closest thing to a tune, which brings us to the crux of the matter - their status as godfathers of techno is unchallenged, but these songs are hollow and too samey."

Robert Semrow of Keyboard wrote: "[Heaven 17] were outstanding before, and have only improved with time. Each song is solid and very dancefloor-friendly. Bigger Than America is similar to their previous sound, with pads and dance grooves providing a backdrop for Gregory's unmistakable strong vocals. Lots of movement, lots of changes, and lots to enjoy." Howard Cohen of Knight Ridder summarised: "Erasure-like Europop cuts "Freak!" and "Another Big Idea" are danceable enough, and there's a throbbing Giorgio Moroder dance remix. But this is largely tuneless, boring stuff. Which explains why few missed Heaven 17 in the first place."

Track listing
 "Dive" – 4:30
 "Designing Heaven" – 5:15
 "We Blame Love" – 4:49
 "Another Big Idea" – 4:57
 "Freak!" – 4:09
 "Bigger Than America" – 4:00
 "Unreal Everything" – 4:10
 "The Big Dipper" – 4:57
 "Do I Believe?" – 4:57
 "Resurrection Man" – 4:06
 "Maybe Forever" – 4:42
 "An Electronic Prayer" – 4:06
 "Designing Heaven – (Mies Van Der Rohe mix)" +
 "Designing Heaven (Den Hemmel Designen) – (Gregorio remix)" +

Tracks marked with "+" are bonus tracks added to the other version of the CD album.

Singles

"Designing Heaven" (30 August 1996)
"We Blame Love" (17 February 1997)

Personnel
Glenn Gregory
Ian Craig Marsh
Martyn Ware

Production
Ray Smith – cover art

References

External links

1996 albums
Cleopatra Records albums
Heaven 17 albums